Atanas Tasev (born 24 May 1921) is a Bulgarian former sports shooter. He competed in the skeet event at the 1968 Summer Olympics.

References

External links
  

1921 births
Possibly living people
Bulgarian male sport shooters
Olympic shooters of Bulgaria
People from Radomir (town)
Shooters at the 1968 Summer Olympics
Sportspeople from Pernik Province